Ontophylogenesis merges the concepts of Ontogenesis  and Phylogenesis to yield Darwinian theory at the cellular level.

Described by its originator   Jean-Jacques Kupiec  as  "the extension of natural selection, taking place inside the organism among the cell populations of which it is constituted. It ends with evolution and ontogenesis merging into a single phenomenon."

Hierarchical analysis of ontogenetic time  describing heterochrony and taxonomy of developmental stages is viewed as segmentation of ontogenetic time depicting ontophylogenesis. This permits the graphical depiction of time based evolutions of  organs for a set of species, and is consistent with accepted theories of evolutionary biology.

References

Phylogenetics
Charles Darwin